Kyle Adams may refer to:

 Kyle Adams (American football) (born 1998), American football tight end
 Kyle Adams (footballer) (born 1996), New Zealand association football defender

See also
 Kylie Adams (born 1967), American fiction author